Hoseynabad-e Hajji Ali Naqi (also Romanized as Ḩoseynābād-e Ḩājjī ‘Alī Naqī; also known as Ḩoseynābād, Ḩoseynābād-e Ḩāj ‘Alī Naqī, Ḩoseynābād-e Ḩājj ‘Alī Naqī, and Husainābād) is a village in Howmeh Rural District, in the Central District of Damghan County, Semnan Province, Iran. At the 2006 census, its population was 161, in 50 families.

References 

Populated places in Damghan County